James Franklin Ware (1849–1934) was a member of the Wisconsin State Assembly and the Wisconsin State Senate.

Biography
Ware was born on February 11, 1849, in Litchfield, Maine. He graduated from Lawrence University in 1871 and from the University of Michigan Law School in 1873.

Career
Ware was a member of the Assembly in 1880, 1881 and 1883. In 1884, he was elected to the Senate from the 18th District. He was a Republican. Around 1887, he married Mary L. Lord, daughter of fellow State Senator Dr. Simon Lock Lord. Between 1893 and 1896 he moved to Galveston, Texas, where he was postmaster and later "president of a gold mining company". Ware moved to Waco, Texas, and later Fort Worth, Texas, where he died on February 4, 1934.

References

1849 births
1934 deaths
People from Litchfield, Maine
Republican Party Wisconsin state senators
Republican Party members of the Wisconsin State Assembly
Wisconsin lawyers
Lawrence University alumni
University of Michigan Law School alumni